Johanna Peters (3 January 1932 – 27 May 2000) was a Scottish mezzo-soprano who played a prominent role in British operatic life during her 40-year career, first as singer, and later as a distinguished voice teacher at the Guildhall School of Music. As a singer, she was particularly known for her intelligent portrayal of a wide variety of character parts and created the roles of Hippolyta in Benjamin Britten's A Midsummer Night's Dream and The Widow Sweeney in Nicholas Maw's The Rising of the Moon. For many years she and her companion, Anne Wood, ran their own small touring company, Phoenix Opera.

References

1932 births
2000 deaths
Operatic mezzo-sopranos
20th-century Scottish women singers
20th-century British women opera singers
British arts administrators
Women arts administrators